The 1st NKP Salve Challenger Trophy or Kedia Cup was an Indian domestic cricket tournament that was held in Kolkata from 18 March to 21 March 1995. The series was invented to involve the domestic and national players from India to showcase their talent, and were allocated in India Seniors, India A, and India B accordingly. The inaugural edition was won by India Seniors after they defeated India A by 73 runs in the final.

Squads

Points Table

Matches

Group stage

Final

References 

Indian domestic cricket competitions